The 2012–13 Danish 1st Division season was the 17th season of the Danish 1st Division league championship, governed by the Danish Football Association. This was the first season with a twelve-club First Division.

The divisional champions and runners-up are promoted to the 2013–14 Danish Superliga. The teams in the 11th and 12th places are relegated to the 2013–14 Danish 2nd Divisions.

Participants
Lyngby Boldklub and HB Køge finished the 2011–12 season of the Superliga in 11th and 12th place, respectively, and were relegated to the 1st Division. They replaced Esbjerg fB and Randers FC, who were promoted to the 2012–13 Danish Superliga.

FC Fyn won the promotion game from the 2011–12 Danish 2nd Divisions against HIK and were promoted to the division. It replaced FC Roskilde, Næstved Boldklub and Blokhus FC, who were relegated after the 2011–12 season as the number of teams in the division was reduced from 14 to 12. But FC Fyn went bankrupt on 1 February 2013. Immediately they were docked 3 points for going into administration and later they withdrew from the tournament during the winter break, and were treated as losing all of their Spring games 3-0.

On 28 September 2012, Akademisk Boldklub (AB) changed its name to Akademisk Boldklub Gladsaxe (AB Gladsaxe) after Gladsaxe Municipality became a sponsor and partner.

Stadia and locations

Personnel and sponsoring 
Note: Flags indicate national team as has been defined under FIFA eligibility rules. Players and Managers may hold more than one non-FIFA nationality.

Managerial changes

League table

See also
2012–13 in Danish football

References

External links
  Danish FA

Danish 1st Division seasons
Denmark
2012–13 in Danish football